The Vietnam women's national handball team is the national team of Vietnam. It is governed by the Vietnam Handball Federation and takes part in international handball competitions.

Asian Championship record
 2008 – 6th
 2017 – 6th

External links
IHF profile

Women's national handball teams
Handball
National team